Jialing is a district of the city of Nanchong, Sichuan Province, China.

Districts of Sichuan
Nanchong